Cap Island Conservation Park is a protected area in the Australian state of South Australia located about  offshore, west of Mount Misery, Eyre Peninsula. The park covers Cap Island's 8ha surface. The island consists of a granite base and a calcarenite mantle; its margins steeply over-hanging and eroded. Typical vegetation is a low Nitre Bush (Nitraria billardierei) shrubland. Cap Island Conservation Park was constituted by statute in 1972 to conserve a sea bird breeding area and Australian Sea-lion (Neophoca cinerea) and New Zealand Fur-seal (Arctocephalus forsteri) haul-out areas.

Cap Island also bears the alternative name of Gap Island and historically was also known as Rocky Island.

History 
Matthew Flinders named the island on 16 February 1802, alluding to the island's topography, geology and cap-like profile. The island was proclaimed a Fauna Conservation Reserve in 1967. and gazetted as the Cap Island Conservation Park in 1972. The conservation park is classified as an IUCN Category Ia protected area.

Fauna 
In addition to marine mammals, at least nine species of birds have been recorded on Cap Island. These include: 
 Chroicocephalus novaehollandiae: Silver Gull
 Haematopus fuliginosus fuliginosus: Sooty Oystercatcher
 Hirundo (Hirundo) neoxena neoxena: Welcome Swallow
 Neophema (Neonanodes) petrophila: Rock Parrot
 Pelagodroma marina: White-faced Storm-petrel
 Sterna (Sterna) striata: White-fronted Tern
 Sternula nereis nereis: Fairy Tern
 Sturnus (Sturnus) vulgaris vulgaris: Common Starling
 Thalasseus bergii: Crested Tern

Flora 
At least eight species of plants have been recorded on Cap Island. They include:
 Apium prostratum var. prostratum: Sea Celery
 Disphyma crassifolium subsp. clavellatum: Rounded Noon-flower
 Frankenia pauciflora var. fruticulosa
 Frankenia pauciflora: Australian Sea-heath
 Lawrencia squamata: Thorny Lawrencia
 Mesembryanthemum crystallinum: Common Ice plant
 Nitraria billardierei: Dillon Bush
 Zygophyllum apiculatum: Callweed

References

External links
Cap Island Conservation Park webpage on protected planet

Conservation parks of South Australia
Protected areas established in 1967
1967 establishments in Australia
Great Australian Bight
Islands of South Australia